This article shows the rosters of all participating teams at the women's football tournament at the 2015 Pan American Games in Toronto. Rosters can have a maximum of 18 athletes.

Group A

Argentina

Head coach:  Julio Olarticoechea

Colombia

Head coach: Felipe Taborda

Mexico

Head coach:  Leonardo Cuellar

Trinidad and Tobago

Head coach:  Ross Rusel

Group B

Brazil

Head coach:  Vadão

Canada

Head coach:  Daniel Worthington

The following players are on the roster for the 2015 Pan American Games. Stats are accurate through July 11 games against Ecuador.

Costa Rica

Head coach:  Amelia Valverde

Ecuador

Head coach:  Vanessa Arauz

References 

Women's team rosters
Pan American Games women's football squads